Dead Can Dance (1981–1998) (2001) is a four-disc box set, containing three CDs of music spanning Dead Can Dance's career and a DVD of their 1994 video release Toward the Within.

While most of the tracks are taken from previously released albums, this set also contains a large number of rarities. "Frontier" (Demo) and "The Protagonist" were originally released on the 1987 4AD compilation Lonely Is an Eyesore. "Labour of Love", "Ocean", "Orion", and "Threshold" were recorded for the John Peel Show in 1983. In 1984, a follow-up Peel Session produced the version of "Carnival of Light" contained in this set. "Sloth" (Radio) was recorded for radio and a studio version was later released on Brendan Perry's solo album Eye of the Hunter. "Bylar", a Lisa Gerrard and Robert Perry (Brendan's brother) composition, was taken from a live performance recorded on 10 July 1996 at the Keswick Theatre in Glenside, Pennsylvania for the Echoes public radio show. It was originally released in 1996 on The Echoes Living Room Concerts Volume 2. “Gloridean” was previously only available on the Towards The Within video but didn’t appear on the CD version. "Sambatiki" was previously released as an accompanying track on the Spiritchaser tour programme. "The Lotus Eaters" is a previously unreleased track, from the sessions for the band's aborted eighth album.

Track listing
All tracks by Dead Can Dance

Disc 1
 "Frontier" (Demo) – 3:01 – 1981
 "Labour of Love" (Radio) – 3:56 – 1983
 "Ocean" (Radio) – 3:38 – 1983
 "Orion" (Radio) – 3:28 – 1983
 "Threshold" (Radio) – 4:10 – 1983
 "Carnival of Light" (Radio) – 3:18 – 1984
 "In Power We Entrust the Love Advocated" – 4:07 – 1984
 "De Profundis (Out of the Depths of Sorrow)" – 3:59 – 1985
 "Avatar" – 4:35 – 1985
 "Enigma of the Absolute" – 4:15 – 1985
 "Summoning of the Muse" – 4:58 – 1987
 "Anywhere Out of the World" – 5:08 – 1987
 "Windfall" – 3:32 – 1987
 "Cantara" – 5:58 – 1987
 "In the Kingdom of the Blind the One-Eyed Are Kings" – 4:12 – 1988
 "Bird" – 5:00 – 1991
 "The Protagonist" – 8:54 – 1984

Disc 2
 "Severance" – 3:23 – 1988
 "The Host of Seraphim" – 6:19 – 1988
 "Song of Sophia" – 1:28 – 1988
 "The Arrival and the Reunion" – 1:41 – 1990
 "Black Sun" – 4:58 – 1990
 "The Promised Womb" – 3:26 – 1990
 "Saltarello" – 2:37 – 1990
 "The Song of the Sibyl" – 3:46 – 1990
 "Spirit" – 5:01 – 1991
 "Yulunga (Spirit Dance)" – 6:56 – 1993
 "The Ubiquitous Mr Lovegrove" (Radio) – 4:35 – 1993
 "Sloth" (Radio) – 2:40 – 1993
 "Bylar" – 6:42 – 1996
 "The Carnival Is Over" (Radio) – 5:45 – 1993
 "The Spider's Stratagem" – 6:42 – 1993
 "The Wind That Shakes the Barley" (Radio) – 2:32 – 1993
 "How Fortunate the Man with None" – 9:09 – 1993

Disc 3
 "I Can See Now" – 2:56 – 1994
 "American Dreaming" – 4:30 – 1994
 "Tristan" – 1:48 – 1994
 "Sanvean" – 3:46 – 1994
 "Rakim" – 5:39 – 1994
 "Gloridean" – 5:51 – 1994
 "Don't Fade Away" – 5:10 – 1994
 "Nierika" – 5:45 – 1996
 "Song of the Nile" – 8:01 – 1996
 "Sambatiki" – 7:31 – 1996
 "Indus" – 9:24 – 1996
 "The Snake and the Moon" (Edit) – 4:13 – 1996
 "The Lotus Eaters" – 6:42 – 1998

Disc 4
 Toward the Within DVD

Personnel 

Richard Avison – Trombone
Tony Ayres – Tympani [Timpani]
John Bonnar – Percussion, Arranger, Keyboards, Vocals, Viol
Charlie Bouis – Assistant Engineer
Pieter Bourke – Percussion, Keyboards
Sarah Buckley – Viola
Guy Charbonneau – Engineer, Mixing
Andrew Claxton – Tuba, Keyboards, Trombone (Bass)
Martin Colley – Engineer
Carolyn Costin – Violin
Dead Can Dance – Arranger, Producer
John Dent – Mastering
Paul Erikson -Bass
Dimitri Ehrlich – Interviewer
Gus Ferguson – Cello
Tony Gamage – Cello, Violoncello
Piero Gasparini – Viola
Lisa Gerrard – Percussion, Vocals, Instrumentation, Yang Chin
Joe Gillingham – Engineer
Dale Buffin Griffin – Producer
Alison Harling – Violin
Lance Hogan – Guitar, Percussion, Guitar (Bass)
Simon Hogg – Trombone
Andrew Hutton – Soprano (Vocal)
Rebecca Jackson – Violin
Paskaal Japhet – Percussion
Kenny Jones – Engineer
Martin McGarrick – Cello
Jason Mitchell – Mastering
Rónán Ó Snodaigh – Percussion, Vocals
Brendan Perry – Guitar, Percussion, Vocals, Hurdygurdy, Instrumentation
Robert C. Perry – Bouzouki, Percussion, Woodwind, Uilleann pipes
James Pinker – Percussion, Tympani [Timpani]
Renaud Pion – Turkish Clarinet
John A. Rivers – Producer, Mastering
Andrew Robinson – Violin
Anne Robinson – Violin
Emlyn Singleton – Violin
John Singleton – Trombone
Peter Ulrich – Percussion, Drums, Tympani [Timpani], Drums (Snare)
Ruth Watson – Oboe
Scott Rodger - Bass
John Willet – Translation
Graham Wood – Design, Photography

References

External links
 Dead Can Dance (1981–1998) at Dead-Can-Dance.com
 Dead Can Dance (1981–1998) Lyrics at Dead-Can-Dance.com

Dead Can Dance albums
2001 compilation albums
2001 video albums
2001 live albums
Live video albums
4AD compilation albums
4AD video albums